2 is the second studio album by American garage rock band Thee Oh Sees, released on June 14, 2004 on Narnack Records. Released under the name, OCS, the album was recorded entirely by John Dwyer as a side-project to his then-primary band, Coachwhips.

Critical reception
In a positive review for Allmusic, Alex Henderson wrote: "2 is perhaps best described as an experimental, oddly appealing mixture of folk-rock and avant-garde noise rock. On these recordings – which were made over a two-year period from 2001–2003 – Dwyer plays a calm, reflective, even pastoral acoustic guitar that interacts with bizarre collages of dissonant electro-noise. [...] This enjoyably intriguing, if slightly uneven, release makes one hope that Dwyer will have more OCS projects outside of Coachwhips."

Track listing

Personnel
John Dwyer – all instruments, recording
Chiara G – additional performing (13)

References

2004 albums
Oh Sees albums